Dragan Andrić (born June 6, 1962 in Dubrovnik) is a Yugoslav former water polo player, two times Olympic gold medalist.

He played for VK Partizan, Pescara, CN Catalunya and coached Chios and Panathinaikos in Greece.

Andrić coached FR Yugoslavian team at the 1996 Summer Olympics, national teams of Japan and Greece.

See also
 Yugoslavia men's Olympic water polo team records and statistics
 List of Olympic champions in men's water polo
 List of Olympic medalists in water polo (men)
 List of world champions in men's water polo
 List of World Aquatics Championships medalists in water polo

References

External links
 

1962 births
Living people
Serbs of Croatia
Sportspeople from Dubrovnik 
Serbian male water polo players
Yugoslav male water polo players
Olympic water polo players of Yugoslavia
Water polo players at the 1984 Summer Olympics
Water polo players at the 1988 Summer Olympics
Olympic gold medalists for Yugoslavia
Medalists at the 1984 Summer Olympics
Medalists at the 1988 Summer Olympics
Serbian water polo coaches
Serbia and Montenegro men's national water polo team coaches
Water polo coaches at the 1996 Summer Olympics
Greece men's national water polo team coaches
Water polo coaches at the 2012 Summer Olympics
Panathinaikos Water Polo Club coaches